An intense tornado outbreak occurred on May 22 in western and Central Oklahoma and on May 23 from eastern and central Oklahoma to central Iowa. A total of 43 tornadoes were reported during the two-day outbreak, of which 14 were recorded as strong or violent (F2 or greater on the Fujita Scale). The outbreak claimed no fatalities and there were only 12 injuries from a tornado that touched down near Clinton, Oklahoma causing significant damage. The tornado outbreak overall left $32.8 million (1981 USD) in damage.

Storm history
On the morning of May 22, 1981, winds moving in from the south brought moist air across Texas and into western Oklahoma and dry line formed across the Texas panhandle. In addition, the interaction between a layer of warm air aloft and the return flow of moist air led to widespread low clouds across the state of Oklahoma. Later that day, the low clouds broke as predicted by forecasters as the dry line moved east into western Oklahoma. However, the clearing was limited to a relatively narrow zone ahead of the dry line. Despite this, daytime heating allowed thunderstorms to form by mid-afternoon.

Confirmed tornadoes

May 22 event

May 23 event

New Cordell, Oklahoma

The first tornado formed northwest of New Cordell, Oklahoma at 4:17 pm (CDT). The tornado damaged a mobile home and several barns as it moved northeast over a six-mile path.  The tornado was photographed 5 times by a storm chaser team during a project conducted by the National Severe Storms Laboratory and Mississippi State University. The tornado turned out to be a significant F2. No deaths or injuries were recorded. Storm chasers would go on to nickname the tornado the "Wizard of Oz" tornado because of its unusual ropey shape, which had a very close resemblance to the twister in the aforementioned movie. In fact, the tornado had no prominent curve at the top as its funnel – much like the Wizard of Oz tornado – as it neared its decaying stage.

Binger–Scott, Oklahoma

A second thunderstorm formed south of the thunderstorm that produced the New Cordell tornado. The second thunderstorm moved northeast, causing some concern among officials and forecasters as the storm was heading directly towards Oklahoma City. The second thunderstorm produced 6–12 tornadoes across a wide area stretching from Fort Cobb Reservoir to Union City. The thunderstorm later encountered cooler, less unstable air and dissipated near Oklahoma City.

One of the group of the tornadoes, this violent tornado touched down near Binger at 6:45 pm (CDT). At the time of formation, it was weak; only causing F1 damage before rapidly intensifying as it approached Scott. It reached F4 status as it passed east of town, and maintained F4 strength as it crossed SH 37 until it dissipated near the Canadian River. Damage from the tornado was severe as it destroyed an old uninhabited house outside of Scott. Two other houses were also destroyed but their walls remained intact. A mile east, the tornado ripped the roof, walls and carport off another house while two more houses were completely destroyed. In addition, the tornado uprooted or damaged several trees and flipped over automobiles and farm equipment during its 16-mile duration.

Near SH 37, the tornado blew away several storage tanks at an Amoco oil storage facility. One of the tanks, which was out of operation because of a lightning strike, was found 1500 ft south of its original location. The other two tanks blown away by the tornado were never found. A 1/2 mile away, the tornado destroyed a farmhouse and a barn, and wrecked a pickup truck. Because the path of the Binger Tornado was mostly over unpopulated areas along with the early warnings and observations provided to people in the path, there were no fatalities or injuries.

Other tornadoes
After the Binger tornado dissipated, a complex of severe thunderstorms regenerated further west across west-central Oklahoma near Foss Reservoir. The thunderstorms produced at least five tornadoes, including an F3 tornado that affected the area around Clinton, Oklahoma, injuring 12 people. In Alfalfa, Oklahoma, two tornadoes were reported, one which did F2 damage. Thunderstorms along and east of a line from Oklahoma City, Kansas City and Omaha, Nebraska produced 29 tornadoes on May 23 across Oklahoma, Missouri, Kansas and Iowa. The same system travelled northwest and produced an F3 tornado that struck Bowl Bay, McCurdy Island on May 25.

See also
List of North American tornadoes and tornado outbreaks

References

F4 tornadoes by date
Tornadoes of 1981
Tornadoes in Oklahoma
Tornado outbreak
1981 in Oklahoma
Tornado outbreak